Chancellor is a title of various official positions in the governments of many nations. A chancellor's office is called a chancellery or chancery. The word is now used in the titles of many various officers in various settings (government, education, religion). Nowadays the term is most often used to describe:
The head of the government
A person in charge of foreign affairs
A person with duties related to justice
A person in charge of financial and economic issues
The head of a university

Governmental positions

Head of government

Austria
Since 2021, the Chancellor of Austria is Karl Nehammer.

Germany

Candidates receiving a majority of the entire membership of the  will be sworn in immediately as new Chancellor.

Since 2021, the German  is Olaf Scholz of the Social Democratic Party of Germany (SPD)

Between 1871 and 1918, the Chancellor was appointed by the German Emperor. During the Weimar Republic (1919-1933), the Chancellor was chosen by the Reichspräsident ("Reich President") and stood under his authority. This continued (formally) during the first two years of the Nazi regime until the death of President Paul von Hindenburg in 1934. Between 1934 and 1945, Adolf Hitler was dictatorial head of state and government of Nazi Germany, being officially titled "" (literally "Leader and Reich Chancellor").

Switzerland

Swiss Confederation
In Switzerland, the Chancellor is not the political head of government, but rather its administrative head as the Chief of Staff of the Swiss Federal Government. They are elected by the Swiss Federal Assembly to head the Federal Chancellery — the general staff of the seven-member executive Federal Council, the Swiss federal government. The Chancellor participates in the meetings of the seven Federal Councilors with a consultative vote and prepares the reports on policy and activities of the council to parliament (assembly). The chancellery is responsible for the publication of all federal laws.

Swiss cantons
In most Swiss cantons there is a State Chancellor who heads the central administrative unit of the cantonal government.   In the Canton of Geneva, the first documents attesting to the existence of a Chancellor go back to the 12th century. In the 16th century the Chancery is officially described as the permanent secretariat of the executive and legislature. The first of these functions still constitutes an important part of its activities in Geneva and other cantons. In the Canton of Berne, the Chancellor is elected by the Grand Council (i.e. Parliament) and has the task of supporting the Grand Council and the Executive Council in carrying out their tasks. The Chancellor directs the staff of the Executive Council, supports the President of the Government and the Executive Council in the performance of their duties, and usually participates as an advisor to the President of the Grand Council in Grand Council sessions.

Foreign minister and diplomatic official
In most countries of Latin America, the equivalents to "chancellor" (Canciller in Spanish and Chanceler in Portuguese) are commonly used to refer to the post of foreign minister. It is often used as a synonym to the full titles of the ministers of foreign affairs. Likewise, the ministry of foreign affairs in Spanish-speaking countries in the Americas is referred to as the Cancillería or in Portuguese-speaking Brazil as Chancelaria. However, in Spain the term canciller refers to a civil servant in the Spanish diplomatic service responsible for technical issues relating to foreign affairs. As to the German foreign service, the term Kanzler (chancellor) refers to the administrative head of a diplomatic mission.

Functions related to justice and the law

Finland
In Finland the Chancellor of Justice supervises the legality of actions taken by the government and monitors the implementation of basic civil liberties. In this special function the chancellor also sits in the Finnish Cabinet, the Finnish Council of State.

Sweden
In Sweden the Chancellor of Justice or  acts as the Solicitor General for the Swedish Government. The office was introduced by Charles XII of Sweden in 1713.

United Kingdom
In the legal system of the United Kingdom, the term can refer to three officials:

The Chancellor of the Exchequer is a senior minister of the Crown within the Government of the United Kingdom, and the chief executive officer of His Majesty's Treasury. As one of the four Great Offices of State, the chancellor is a high-ranking member of the British Cabinet
The Lord Chancellor (Lord High Chancellor, King's Chancellor) is the occupant of one of the oldest offices of state, dating back to the Kingdom of England, and older than Parliament itself. Theoretically, the Lord Chancellor is the Chancellor of Great Britain. A former office of "Chancellor of Ireland" was abolished in 1922, when all but Northern Ireland left the United Kingdom. The Lord Chancellor is the second-highest non-royal subject in precedence (after the Archbishop of Canterbury). In addition to various ceremonial duties, he is head of the Ministry of Justice, which was created in May 2007 from the Department for Constitutional Affairs (which was created in 2003 from the Lord Chancellor's Department). In this role, he sits in the Cabinet.  Until the Constitutional Reform Act of 2005, the Lord Chancellor had two additional roles:
Head of the English, but not Scottish, judiciary.  In previous centuries, the Lord Chancellor was the sole judge in the Court of Chancery; when, in 1873, that court was combined with others to form the High Court, the Lord Chancellor became the nominal head of the Chancery Division. The Lord Chancellor was permitted to participate in judicial sittings of the House of Lords; he also chose the committees that heard appeals in the Lords.  The de facto head of the Chancery Division was the Vice-Chancellor, and the role of choosing appellate committees was in practice fulfilled by the Senior Lord of Appeal in Ordinary.
De facto speaker of the House of Lords. These duties are now undertaken by the Lord Speaker. Jack Straw was the first Lord Chancellor to be a member of the House of Commons, rather than the House of Lords or its predecessor, the Curia Regis, since Sir Christopher Hatton in 1578.
The Chancellor of the High Court is the head of the Chancery Division of the High Court of Justice.  Before 2005, the judge occupying this position was known as the Vice-Chancellor, the Lord Chancellor being the nominal head of the Division.

Some states in the United States
Some U.S. states, like Delaware, Tennessee, and Mississippi, still maintain a separate Court of Chancery with jurisdiction over equity cases. Judges who sit on those courts are called chancellors.

Other governmental positions

Denmark
In Denmark, the office of chancellor (or royal chancellor) seems to have appeared in the 12th century, and until 1660 it was the title of the leader of the state administration (a kind of a "Home Office" but often with foreign political duties). Often he appeared to be the real leader of the government. From 1660 until 1848, the title continued as "Grand Chancellor" or "President of the Danish Chancellery", and was replaced in 1730 by the title "Minister of Domestic Affairs".

Estonia
In Estonia, a Chancellor directs the work of a ministry and coordinates institutions subject to the ministry. A ministry can also have one or several Vice-Chancellors (Asekantsler), who fulfill the duties of the Chancellor, when they are absent. The Chancellor of Justice (currently Ülle Madise) supervises the legality of actions taken by the government and monitors the implementation of basic civil liberties.

United Kingdom
Several posts carry the title of Chancellor in the United Kingdom:
Chancellor of the Exchequer, the minister with overall responsibility for HM Treasury. This is an ancient title dating back to the Kingdom of England. It is roughly the equivalent of the Minister of Finance or Secretary of the Treasury in other governmental systems. In recent years, when the term chancellor is used in British politics, it is taken as referring to the Chancellor of the Exchequer. As Second Lord of the Treasury, the Chancellor has an official residence at 11 Downing Street, next door to the First Lord of the Treasury, the Prime Minister, at 10 Downing Street, in London.
 In a county palatine or liberty, where a local lord exercised personal jurisdiction that elsewhere was reserved to the Crown, the head of the lord's administration was often titled "chancellor". Where the lord was a bishop (as with the Bishop of Ely in Isle of Ely or the Archbishop of York in Hexhamshire) then this officer was called the temporal chancellor to  distinguish him from the bishop's ecclesiastical chancellor. While palatine and liberty jurisdictions are practically obsolete, the ceremonial title chancellor remains in use:
Chancellor of the Duchy of Lancaster: in effect, as the sinecure position of a minister without portfolio, often given to senior politicians so they have a seat in the cabinet.
Chancellor of Cornwall, Keeper of the Great Seal, second only to the Lord Warden of the Stannaries within the Duchy of Cornwall.

United States
In the United States, the only "chancellor" established by the federal government is the Chancellor of the Smithsonian Institution, a largely ceremonial office held by the Chief Justice of the United States. As the Smithsonian is a research and museum system, its use of the title is perhaps best thought of as akin to a university's chancellor.

Ecclesiastical position

The chancellor is the principal record-keeper of a diocese or eparchy, or their equivalent. The chancellor is a notary, so that he may certify official documents, and often has other duties at the discretion of the bishop of the diocese: he may be in charge of some aspect of finances or of managing the personnel connected with diocesan offices, although his delegated authority cannot extend to vicars of the diocesan bishop, such as vicars general, episcopal vicars or judicial vicars. His office is within the "chancery". Vice-chancellors may be appointed to assist the chancellor in busy chanceries. Normally, the chancellor is a priest or deacon, although in some circumstances a layperson may be appointed to the post. In the eparchial curia a chancellor is to be appointed who is to be a presbyter (priest) or deacon and whose principal obligation, unless otherwise established by the particular law, is to see that the acts of the curia are gathered and arranged as well as preserved in the archives of the eparchial curia.

In England, the Consistory courts of the Church of England are each presided over by a Chancellor of the Diocese.

In the United Methodist Church, each Annual Conference has a Conference Chancellor, who is the Annual Conference's legal adviser and representative. While the Annual Conference usually hires outside professional counsel in matters that require legal representation, that hiring and representation is done under the supervision, and with the consent, of the Conference Chancellor.

Educational position

A chancellor is the leader, either ceremonial or executive, of many public and private universities and related institutions.

The heads of the New York City Department of Education and the District of Columbia Public Schools, who run the municipally-operated public schools in those jurisdictions, carry the title of Chancellor. New York State also has a Chancellor of the University of the State of New York, the body that licenses and regulates all educational and research institutions in the state and many professions (not to be confused with the State University of New York, an actual institution of higher learning).

In a few instances, the term chancellor applies to a student or faculty member in a high school or an institution of higher learning who is either appointed or elected as chancellor to preside on the highest ranking judicial board or tribunal. They handle non-academic matters such as violations of behavior.

In Germany many heads of university administration carry the title  (Chancellor) while the academical heads carry the title  (Rector). In order to avoid any misunderstanding, the head of the German Federal Government is therefore usually called by the official title  (Federal Chancellor).

Historical uses
Chancellor or Grand Chancellor is the common translation of the Chinese title zǎixiàng, or chéngxiàng, which in imperial China was the highest-ranking executive official serving under the emperor. See also: Chancellor of the Tang dynasty.
The  was the head of the Daijō-kan (Great Council of State) during and after the Nara period and briefly under the Meiji Constitution.
The chancellor in the government of the Holy Roman Empire.
There are two ancient Egyptian titles sometimes translated as chancellor. 
The "royal sealer" (xtmtj-bity or xtmw-bity), a title which conveyed a certain rank at the royal court, attested since the First Dynasty (about 3000 BC). People holding the post include Imhotep and Hemaka.
The "Keeper of the Royal Seal" (or overseer of the seal or treasurer—imy-r xtmt) was responsible for the state's income. This position appears around 2000 BC. Officials holding the post include Bay or Irsu, Khety Meketre, and Nakhti.
For centuries, the King of France appointed the Chancellor of France, a Great Officer of the Crown, as an office associated with that of keeper of the seals. The chancelier was responsible for some judicial proceedings. During the reigns of Louis XVIII, Charles X and Louis Philippe, the Chancellor of France presided over the Chamber of Peers, the upper house of the royal French parliament.
In the Kingdom of Poland from the 14th century, there was a royal chancellor. In the Polish–Lithuanian Commonwealth (1569–1795), the four chancellors were among the ten highest officials of the state. Poland and Lithuania each had a Grand Chancellor and a Deputy Chancellor, each entitled to a senatorial seat, responsible for the affairs of the whole Kingdom, each with his own chancery. See Offices in the Polish–Lithuanian Commonwealth.
In the Russian Empire, the chancellor was the highest rank of civil service as defined by the Table of Ranks and on the same grade as field marshal and General Admiral. Only the most distinguished government officials were promoted to this grade, such as foreign ministers Alexander Gorchakov and Alexey Bestuzhev-Ryumin.
In Norway the Chancellor of Norway (modern Norwegian: Norges rikes kansler, "Chancellor of Norway's Realm") was the most important aide of the King of Norway during the Middle Ages. He issued laws and regulations, and was responsible for day-to-day administration of the kingdom. From 1270, the Chancellor resided in Bergen. Haakon V of Norway moved the Chancellor's residence to Oslo; on 31 August 1314 the provost of St Mary's Church became Chancellor on a permanent basis. He was given the Great Seal of the Realm "for eternity." The Chancellors were originally chosen from the clergy. The position lost its importance after Jens Bjelke's tenure, and was abolished in 1679.
 The Lord Chancellor of Scotland. 
The canghellor of medieval Wales administered the peasantry of the king's demesne and was charged with holding the king's pleas and "waste".
 A "State Chancellor" (German: Staatskanzler) was head of government in German-Austria after World War I and again after World War II in post-war Austria. Both times the State Chancellor was Karl Renner.

See also
 Logothete
Prime minister

References

 
Titles of national or ethnic leadership